Ultraviolet by Paul Pairet is a single-table restaurant in Shanghai, China, opened in May 2012 by French chef Paul Pairet and the VOL Group. Since October 2014 Ultraviolet became one of the restaurant members of Les Grandes Tables du Monde, the first restaurant in this organization from China. In September 2017, the second edition of Michelin Guide Shanghai released the result for 2018, and Ultraviolet received 3 Michelin stars.

Overview 
Billed as the first multi-sensory restaurant in the world, Ultraviolet uses sight, sound and smell to enhance the food through a controlled and tailored atmosphere.
The restaurant has a single table of 10 seats and serves a single 20+ course dinner menu for ten guests each night. The dining room of Ultraviolet is ascetic with no décor, no artifacts, no paintings, and no views.
The room is equipped with multi-sensory high-end technology such as dry scent projectors, stage and UV lighting, 360 degree wall projection, table projectors, beam speakers and a multichannel speaker system.
Each course of the menu is accompanied by lights, sounds, music, and/or scents, and enhanced with its own tailored atmosphere to provide context for the dish's taste.

Ultraviolet originally evolved from Pairet’s desire to reduce the technical constraints of the traditional restaurant, which is organized to provide “a la carte” service. This type of organization requires preparation methods that Pairet considers “sub-standard”. By monitoring the timing of the courses and offering a fixed menu, Ultraviolet is able to optimize the control and the quality of cooking in ways that the majority of traditional restaurants cannot – a model that has roots in the historical “table d’hôte” concept. This control allows Ultraviolet to play on and direct the atmosphere for each dish through multi-sensory technology.

Ultraviolet incorporates technology traditionally used in unrelated fields to drive and control the “psycho taste” and enhance the perception of food. This concept is based on Pairet's interest and desire to stimulate what he calls the ‘psycho-taste’. Howie Kahn, writing in The New York Times, conveyed Pairet's idea that ‘psycho taste’ allows eating to “act as a gateway to the mind” and “it delves into the notion that memories, associations, expectations, ideas, misunderstandings, joys and fears all play a role in the experience of a meal.”

Cuisine 
The restaurant's cuisine draws on Pairet’s French background, his experience working in Paris, Hong Kong, Sydney, Jakarta and Istanbul, and is a blend of experimentation, comfort and simplicity. The restaurant has described its cuisine as “avant-garde figurative.”
After developing this concept since 1996, Pairet publicly presented the final theory of Ultraviolet for the first time in 2010 at the OFF5 French Omnivore Food Festival in Deauville, France.

Reception

Overview
Howie Kahn commented in The New York Times Style Magazine, "Ultraviolet, and its auteur, seem like the next steps in the chain of culinary evolution". He also described the food and dining experience as "succeed[ing] brilliantly, mesmerizingly and, as intended, deliciously.  Both UV menus reflect Pairet’s personality directly, setting the table with humor and grace, mischief and whimsy, with puzzles to solve and dishes to think through."

Brian Johnston wrote for Sydney Morning Herald, "this is probably the most avant-garde restaurant in the world." In another of Johnston's write-ups in Voyeur, Virgin Airlines' in-flight magazine, he wrote, "There's no more outrageously original restaurant on the planet than the recently opened Ultraviolet..."

Claudio Grillenzoni reviewed the restaurant for Identita Golose in 2013, describing Ultraviolet as: "An incredible psycho-gustative odyssey lasting 4 hours and 22 dishes". He commented on the food, saying “all dishes, on top of being remarkable, are always served in a very fun and unassuming way… one of the most experimental and challenging, one of the most fun and accomplished of the recent past.”

Crystyl Mo wrote for Time Out Shanghai in Ultraviolet's opening month (May 2012), "Ultraviolet is radical and it was very much worth the wait… The food is central to the night, never just a prop; each meticulously crafted bite is so delectable, we’re left craving more after nearly every course."

Condé Nast Traveller UK edition selected Ultraviolet in its Gold Standard Restaurants 2013, saying “Ultraviolet is China's most immersive foodie experience… Truly extraordinary.”

Food & Wine US listed Ultraviolet in its global Go List in 2014 May issue, "An evening at Ultraviolet is a surreal drama... Paul Pairet serves 22 courses, each a theatrical production with music, scents and video."

Kristie Lu Stout's article and video interview with Pairet on CNN first posted in 2016 described Ultraviolet, "Hidden away in an old Shanghai neighborhood is arguably one of the most innovative restaurants in the world."

The Telegraph reviewed the restaurant and released an article in June 2017, writing it as "the world's most innovative restaurant", "a culinary experience beyond compare".

Ultraviolet has received three Michelin stars since the second edition of Michelin Guide Shanghai released in September 2017, after its two stars in the first edition.

It is one of world's greatest places in 2018 by Time.

William Reed Business Media
Ultraviolet was ranked the 8th best restaurant in William Reed Business Media's Asia's 50 Best Restaurants list in both 2013 and 2014, the 60th world's best restaurants in 2013 (when Paul Pairet's other restaurant Mr & Mrs Bund was ranked the 43rd), and the 58th in 2014 in The World's 50 Best Restaurants 51-100 list.

In 2015: No. 3 in Asia's 50 Best Restaurants, and No. 24 in The World's 50 Best Restaurants.

In 2016: No. 7 in Asia's 50 Best Restaurants, and No. 42 in The World's 50 Best Restaurants.

In 2017: No. 8 in Asia's 50 Best Restaurants, and No. 41 in The World's 50 Best Restaurants.

In 2018: No. 8 in Asia's 50 Best Restaurants, the winner of Art of Hospitality Award, and No. 24 in The World's 50 Best Restaurants.

In 2019: No. 6 in Asia's 50 Best Restaurants, and No. 48 in The World's 50 Best Restaurants.

Sublimotion controversy
Paul Pairet criticized Paco Roncero's restaurant, Sublimotion, which opened in 2014, for suspected copying of his restaurant, especially objecting to Sublimotion being marketed as "the first gastronomic show in the world".

See also
 List of Michelin 3-star restaurants
 List of restaurants in China

References 

Restaurants in Shanghai
Restaurants established in 2012
Michelin Guide starred restaurants in China